The 2013–14 Belgian Basketball Cup or The Base Cup for sponsorship reasons, was the 60th season of the annual cup tournament in Belgium. Telenet BC Oostende was the defending champion.

The Final Four was held from 19 till 21 April in Paleis 12 in Brussels. It was the first time since 2003 the Belgian Basketbal Cup included a Final Four. Telenet BC Oostende defeated Port of Antwerp Giants 88–79 to win its 14th cup in franchise history. Dušan Djordjević of Oostende was named Final Four MVP.

Bracket

Final Four

Semifinals

Final

References

Belgian Basketball Cup
Cup